The 1977–78 Elitserien season was the third season of the Elitserien, the top level of ice hockey in Sweden. 10 teams participated in the league, and Skellefteå AIK won the championship.

Standings

Playoffs

External links
 Swedish Hockey League official site
1978 Swedish national championship finals at SVT's open archive 

Swedish Hockey League seasons
1977–78 in Swedish ice hockey
Swedish